Night School Studio, LLC is an American video game developer and publisher founded on June 6, 2014 by Sean Krankel and Adam Hines, and is based in Glendale, California.

After the founding of the company, the team started development on their debut, Oxenfree. After setting up a casting call on Backstage, the team moved to the development of the game. The first footage of the game was released on May 18, 2015, and the release was set for January 2016. Soon after, the game received positive reviews and a film adaptation is in plans with Skybound Entertainment.

Along with Telltale Games, Night School Studio also co-developed the "Text Adventure" mode for Mr. Robot:1.51exfiltrati0n (called Mr. Robot:1.51exfiltrati0n.ipa on iOS and Mr. Robot:1.51exfiltrati0n.apk on Android). Night School Studio was acquired by Netflix in September 2021 as part of the streaming service's venture into video games.

History 
Night School Studio was founded on October 1, 2014 by Sean Krankel and his cousin Adam Hines, both respectively former Telltale Games and Disney Interactive Studios developers. After setting up the company, the team then decided to develop a new game. Soon after, a casting call was issued by the company on Backstage which then expired on November 21, 2014.

On March 1, 2015, the team posted a video titled "OXENFREE Official Trailer #1" onto their YouTube account. The group then announced Oxenfree on March 5, in which the plot revolved around a group of teenagers exploring a decommissioned island surrounded by ghosts. The studio, according to Krankel, had a very tight budget and could only make a single game. Gameplay footage was then released on 18 May. On October 23, the second teaser was released, as well as the game's release slated for January 2016. On October 27, in an interview with Koalition, when asked about the talking mechanic, Krankel said:If talking is the core mechanic of the game, how can we streamline the talking process? First, we can stop taking player control away and forcing the player into a cut scene. Next, we can put the dialogue choices as close to the player character as possible, so their dialogue choices really feel like an extension of their avatar. Those two design goals really drove a lot of our creative choices; everything from camera placement to the art direction to the pacing of the game.On January 14, 2016, the launch trailer was released. A day after, the game was released for Microsoft Windows, OS X and Xbox One. Within the same day, Skybound Entertainment announced a partnership with Night School Studio, in which a web series entitled The Story of Oxenfree was then released, detailing development on the game, as well a film adaptation and merchandise. On April 27 the company then announced that PlayStation 4 version would be released, with an extended mode called Game+, and was included in all versions after release. It was then released on 31 May, with a Linux version released on June 1. The game received positive reviews from critics, and was selected for Indiecade, which will be hosted from October 14–16 in San Francisco.

During August 2016, Mr. Robot:1.51exfiltrati0n, a mobile game based on the television series Mr. Robot, was developed by Night School Studio, the company's mobile debut, and published by Telltale. Following release, a "Text" mode, being co-developed by Telltale, was also included within the game as well.

Around this time, Telltale had acquired the rights to make a game based on the television show Stranger Things. While Telltale was planning its own adventure game, they contacted Night School to develop a companion game, a first-person narrative title that would serve as a lead-in to their game. Night School brought in four more staff to help with this game. However, over the course of 2017 and 2018, Telltale had several internal issues, leading to difficulties in communication between the Telltale and Night School teams, and failure of Telltale to pay for completed milestones. In October 2018, Telltale announced its surprise closure, leaving Night School's game in limbo. According to a source speaking to The Verge, Night School would have also suffered financial hardships if they had not been concurrently working on Afterparty as well.

Night School Studio was acquired by Netflix in September 2021, as part of Netflix's venture into video game offerings. The acquisition did not affect the studio's work on Oxenfree II.

Games developed

See also
 Duncan the Wonder Dog by cofounder Adam Hines

References

External links 
 

2014 establishments in California
American companies established in 2014
Indie video game developers
Video game companies based in California
Video game companies established in 2014
Companies based in Glendale, California
Video game development companies
2021 mergers and acquisitions
Netflix
American corporate subsidiaries